Hamming may refer to:

 Richard Hamming (1915–1998), American mathematician
 Hamming(7,4), in coding theory, a linear error-correcting code
 Overacting, or acting in an exaggerated way

See also 
 Hamming code, error correction in telecommunication
 Hamming distance, a way of defining how different two sequences are
 Hamming weight, the number of non-zero elements in a sequence
 Hamming window, a mathematical function used in signal processing
 Hammond (disambiguation)
 Ham (disambiguation)